Bucculatrix ivella (the groundsel leaf-perforator moth or groundsel leaf-mining moth) is a moth of the family Bucculatricidae. It was described in 1900 by August Busck. It is native to North America, but has been introduced to Queensland, Australia.

The larvae feed on Baccharis halimifolia and Baccharis neglecta.

External links
Australian Faunal Directory
Australian Insects

Moths of Australia
Bucculatricidae
Moths described in 1900